Shemaryahu Talmon (Hebrew: שמריהו טלמון) (born Shemaryahu Zelmanowicz; 1920 in Skierniewice, Poland – December 15, 2010) was J. L. Magnes Professor of Bible at the Hebrew University of Jerusalem, known particularly for his work in the Hebrew University Bible Project.

Early life

Talmon was born in Poland in 1920, growing up and studying in the city of Breslau (which was then in Germany). He was educated at the Jüdisches Reform-Real Gymnasium in Breslau, Germany. He was a detainee at Buchenwald concentration camp during the Holocaust. During that time his parents and two sisters were killed, he managed to emigrate to Palestine.

He obtained a PhD from the Hebrew University of Jerusalem in 1956. His thesis was on the text and versions of the Tanakh, especially "double meanings" in Biblical texts.  He subsequently extended and refined his thesis, and contributed to many areas of biblical study.

Religious work
He worked with Moshe Goshen-Gottstein and Chaim Rabin on the Hebrew University Bible Project, and after their deaths served as its editor in chief.  His work helped to advance the understanding of the biblical text, especially the Dead Sea Scrolls. He combined his interest in the scrolls and sociology to study the nature and history of the "community of the renewed covenant."

In interfaith activities he was a leader in international Jewish-Christian dialogue, working with the World Council of Churches and the Vatican. In the area of Biblical education, he was director for educational institutions in the Immigration Camps in Cyprus (1947–48). He taught at the major Israeli universities and been a visiting professor at many institutions throughout the world. He was the rector of the University of Haifa and of the Institute of Judaic Studies at the College of Jewish Studies at Heidelberg, dean of the Faculty of Humanities at the Hebrew University.

In December 2008, Talmon donated a library of 10,000 volumes, mostly in Biblical studies, to the Shalom Hartman Institute.

Publications
His publications include "Qumran and the History of the Biblical Text" (1975), "King, Cult, and Calendar" (1986), "Gesellschaft und Literatur in der Hebräischen Bibel" (1988), "The World of Qumran from Within" (1989) and hundreds of articles in scholarly journals.

Awards 
In 1997, Talmon was awarded the Israel Prize, for Biblical studies.

See also 
 List of Israel Prize recipients

References

Further reading
 
 Sha'arei Talmon: Essays presented to Shemaryahu Talmon ed. Michael Fishbane and Emanuel Tov, Eisenbrauns, 1992, .
 Video of dedication of Talmon collection to Shalom Hartman Institute

1920 births
2010 deaths
Israeli biblical scholars
Israeli sociologists
Polish sociologists
Israel Prize in biblical studies recipients
Academic staff of the Hebrew University of Jerusalem
Hebrew University of Jerusalem alumni
Israeli Jews
Polish emigrants to Israel
People from Skierniewice
Buchenwald concentration camp survivors
Dead Sea Scrolls
Christian and Jewish interfaith dialogue
Academic staff of the University of Haifa
Polish expatriates in Germany